Józef Szajba (14 January 1910 – 1945) was a Polish sailor. He competed in the mixed 6 metres at the 1936 Summer Olympics. Szajba was murdered by Nazis in 1945.

References

1910 births
1945 deaths
Date of death unknown
Olympic sailors of Poland
Sailors at the 1936 Summer Olympics – 6 Metre
Polish military personnel killed in World War II
Polish people executed by Nazi Germany
People from Lublin Voivodeship
Polish male sailors (sport)
20th-century Polish people